Diane Larson is an American politician who has served in the North Dakota Senate from the 30th district since 2017. She previously served in the North Dakota House of Representatives from the 30th district from 2013 to 2016.

References

Living people
Politicians from Bismarck, North Dakota
Women state legislators in North Dakota
Republican Party members of the North Dakota House of Representatives
Republican Party North Dakota state senators
Year of birth missing (living people)
21st-century American politicians
21st-century American women politicians